Rivers of America may refer to:
List of rivers of the Americas
Rivers of America (Disney), an attraction at Disney theme parks
Rivers of America Series, a series of books on American rivers